Sobhuza may refer to:
Sobhuza I of Swaziland (ca. 1780 – 1839?), king (ngwenyama) of KaNgwane
Sobhuza II of Swaziland (1899 – 1982), Paramount Chief and later King of Swaziland